Dan's Papers is a free weekly lifestyle publication in the Hamptons, Long Island, New York, USA, founded by Dan Rattiner.The first of the papers that would later collectively come to be known as Dan's Papers was the Montauk Pioneer, which debuted July 1, 1960. Dan's Papers is currently published by Schneps Media.

In 2007, Dan's Papers was sold to Ohio-based Brown Publishing Company. After Brown went bankrupt, Dan's Papers was acquired by Manhattan Media in 2010.

Dan's Papers has gained notoriety for perpetrating various hoaxes, such as stories of a Hamptons Subway beneath the East End of Long Island. The first of these, in 1963, happened by mistake when founder Dan Rattiner incorrectly printed the timetable of trains in the paper. He received a call from the local stationmaster, who told him a crowd of people were there waiting for a train that doesn't exist.  The error made Rattiner realize he could do things to get the whole town talking about his paper.

On June 9, 2020, Dan's Papers announced its merger with The Independent to form a new entity, Dan's Independent Media. In September 2020, Dan's Independent Media was acquired by Schneps Media.

References

External links
 
 New York State Historic Newspapers Montauk Pioneer

1960 establishments in New York (state)
Free magazines
Lifestyle magazines published in the United States
Magazines established in 1960
Magazines published in New York (state)
Weekly magazines published in the United States